At the 2011 Pan American Games in Guadalajara, three different gymnastics disciplines were contested: artistic gymnastics, rhythmic gymnastics and trampoline.  The artistic gymnastics events were held on October 24–29.  The rhythmic gymnastics events were held on October 21–24.  The trampoline events were held on October 16–19. All three events were held at the Nissan Gymnastics Stadium.

Medal summary

Medal table

Artistic gymnastics

Men's events

Women's events

Rhythmic gymnastics

Individual

Group

Trampoline

Schedule
All times are Central Daylight Time (UTC-5).

Qualification

See also

Pan American Gymnastics Championships
South American Gymnastics Championships
Gymnastics at the 2012 Summer Olympics

References

 

 
Events at the 2011 Pan American Games
Pan American Games
2011
2011 in women's gymnastics